Pornmaking for Dummies (aka The Sex Film) is a 2007 South Korean film. An independent production created by former pornographic film director Kong Ja-kwan, Pornmaking for Dummies is a fictional story based on his own personal experiences of working within that industry.

Plot summary 
Jin-gyu, an out of work film school graduate, applies for the position of director with pornographic film company Only4Men. The following day he is hired as an assistant director for a production called All Nude Boy, and must become accustomed to working with makeshift locations, impromptu settings, and abuse from the general public. The production's lead actress, Sabine, becomes attracted to him, and the two end up spending the night together after a staff dinner. Later, Jin-gyu gets an offer to work on a real film for a major production company.

Release 
Pornmaking for Dummies was given a limited release in South Korea from 15 November 2007, and received a total of 498 admissions from seven screens nationwide.

References

External links 
  
 Pornmaking for Dummies at the Korean Movie Database
 Pornmaking for Dummies at HanCinema
 

2007 films
Films about pornography
2000s Korean-language films
South Korean comedy-drama films
2000s South Korean films